The 2010–11 Liga I was the ninety-third season of the top-level football league of Romania. The season commenced on 23 July 2010 and ended on 21 May 2011.  A winter break where no matches were played was held between 11 December 2010 and 18 February 2011. A total of eighteen teams participated in the league, where CFR Cluj were the defending champions.

Teams
Politehnica Iași, Ceahlăul Piatra Neamț and Unirea Alba Iulia were relegated to Liga II after finishing the 2009–10 season in the bottom three places. Ceahlăul Piatra Neamț and Unirea Alba Iulia made their immediate return to the second level, while Politehnica Iași ended a six-year tenure in the highest football league of Romania. 15th-placed team Pandurii Târgu Jiu, who originally were to be relegated as well, were allowed to remain in Liga I after Internațional Curtea de Argeș withdrew from the league because of financial reasons. Internațional thus returned to Liga II after having been promoted the previous season.

The four relegated teams were replaced by the champions and runners-up from both 2009–10 Liga II divisions. Victoria Brănești and Sportul Studențesc were promoted from Seria I while Târgu Mureș and Universitatea Cluj were promoted from Seria II, with Victoria Brănești and Universitatea Cluj being constrained to play their home games on grounds in other cities (than home based) as their did not meet Liga I requirements.

Venues

Personnel and kits

Managerial changes

League table

Positions by round

Results

Top goalscorers

Source: Liga1.ro 
1 Bogdan Stancu was transferred to Galatasaray during the winter transfer window.

Champion squad

References

Liga I seasons
Romania
1